Saif Lodin is an Afghan social activist, historian, writer, Intellectual and a former finance officer in Department of Education in Kandahar. His popularity increased when he started working on an educational program with Humayun Azizi, the former governor of Kandahar. The program was about to upgrade educational systems in Kandahar University. Ludin is a well-known personality among the youth of South Afghanistan, especially in Kandahar.

Personal life
Saif Lodin was born in 1988 to a family of the Ludin tribe of Pashtuns in  Kandahar, Afghanistan. Ludin started his career as an IT officer with the Afghan Telecom.

References

Afghan activists
People from Kandahar
1988 births
Living people